Weetwood Playing Fields is a sports facility of the University of Leeds located in the Leeds suburb of Weetwood, West Yorkshire, England.

Cricket
Among the facilities are a cricket ground, which is used by Leeds/Bradford MCCU. The team played a first-class match at the ground against Yorkshire in 2019, which resulted in a Yorkshire victory by an innings and 151 runs. The ground was scheduled to host a further first-class match between Leeds/Bradford MCCU and Warwickshire in 2020, however this was cancelled due to the COVID-19 pandemic in England. With the loss of first-class status for MCC University matches from the 2021 season onward, first-class cricket at the Playing Fields has ended for the foreseeable future.

Records

First-class
 Highest team total: 489 for 8 declared by Yorkshire v Leeds/Bradford MCCU, 2019
 Lowest team total: 119 all out by Leeds/Bradford MCCU v Yorkshire, as above
 Highest individual innings: 176 by Tom Kohler-Cadmore for Yorkshire v Leeds/Bradford MCCU, as above
 Best innings bowling figures: 5 for 16 by Matthew Waite, as above

See also
List of cricket grounds in England and Wales

References

External links
ESPNcricinfo

Cricket grounds in West Yorkshire
University of Leeds
University sports venues in the United Kingdom